Richard James Cushing (August 24, 1895 – November 2, 1970) was an American prelate of the Catholic Church. He served as Archbishop of Boston from 1944 to 1970 and was made a cardinal in 1958. Cushing's main role was as fundraiser and builder of new churches, schools, and institutions. Unlike his predecessor, he was on good terms with practically the entire Boston elite, as he softened the traditional confrontation between the Catholic Irish and the Protestant upper-class. He built useful relationships with Jews, Protestants, and institutions outside the usual Catholic community.  He helped presidential candidate John F. Kennedy deflect fears of papal interference in American government if a Catholic became  president.

Cushing's high energy level allowed him to meet with many people all day, often giving lengthy speeches at night. He was not efficient at business affairs, and when expenses built up he counted on his fundraising skills instead of cost-cutting.  Cushing, says Nasaw, was "fun-loving, informal, and outgoing.  He looked rather like a tough, handsome, Irish cop and behaved more like a ward politician than a high church cleric."<ref>David Nasaw, The Patriarch: The Remarkable Life and Turbulent Times of Joseph P.  Kennedy (2012) pp 625-27</ref>  His major weakness in retrospect was overexpansion, adding new institutions that could not be sustained in the long run and had to be cut back by his successors.

Early life and education
Cushing was born in City Point, South Boston on August 24, 1895. The third of five children, he was the son of Patrick and Mary (née Dahill) Cushing. His parents were both Irish immigrants; his father was originally from Glanworth, County Cork, and his mother from Touraneena, County Waterford. His father, who came to the United States in 1880, worked as a blacksmith and earned $18 per week in the trolley repair pits of the Boston Elevated Railway.

Cushing received his early education at Perry Public Grammar School in South Boston, since there was then no parochial school for boys in Gate of Heaven Parish. Cushing dropped out of high school in his freshman year because of his compulsive truancy. He subsequently entered Boston College High School, a Jesuit college preparatory school. His tuition there was paid by his cousin, who was a priest of the Archdiocese of New York. He graduated from high school in 1913, receiving honors for Latin and Greek. Cushing was torn for a time between religion and politics. He originally wanted to be a politician, even earning money by speaking for politicians from the back of wagons.  He twice considered joining the Jesuits, but came to the conclusion he "was cut out more for the active life and not the teaching apostolate."

He entered Boston College in 1913, becoming a member of the first freshman class following the college's move to Chestnut Hill. At Boston College, he was active in the Marquette Debating Society and elected vice-president of his sophomore class. Following the sinking of the RMS Lusitania in 1915, Cushing enlisted in the United States Army but was medically discharged for his asthma after a few weeks. After attending Boston College for two years, he began his studies for the priesthood at St. John's Seminary in Brighton in September 1915. He was assigned to continue his studies at the Pontifical North American College in Rome, but the escalation of U-boat activity prevented him from sailing across the Atlantic.

Priesthood
On May 26, 1921, Cushing was ordained a priest by Cardinal William Henry O'Connell at the Cathedral of the Holy Cross. His first assignment was as a curate at St. Patrick's Church in Roxbury, where he remained for two months. He was afterwards transferred to St. Benedict's Church in Somerville. In 1922, he appeared unannounced at the residence of Cardinal O'Connell to request an assignment as a missionary. The young priest declared he wanted to "take heaven by storm." O'Connell denied his request, and instead appointed him assistant director of the Boston office of the Society for the Propagation of the Faith, an organization dedicated to raising funds for missions. He later served as director of the Society from 1929 to 1944. He was raised to the rank of Monsignor on May 14, 1939.

Episcopal career
On June 10, 1939, after Bishop Francis Spellman was named Archbishop of New York, Cushing was appointed, at the request of Cardinal O'Connell, as Auxiliary Bishop of Boston and titular bishop of Mela by Pope Pius XII. He received his episcopal consecration on the following June 29 from Cardinal O'Connell, at the Cathedral of the Holy Cross, with bishops John Bertram Peterson and Thomas Addis Emmet, SJ, serving as co-consecrators. Cushing took as his episcopal motto: Ut Cognoscant Te (Latin: "That they may know thee").

As an auxiliary bishop, Cushing continued to serve as director of the Society for the Propagation of the Faith, and was also named pastor of Sacred Heart Church in Newton Centre. Following the death of Cardinal O'Connell in April 1944, he served as apostolic administrator of the archdiocese.

Archbishop of Boston
Cushing was named the third Archbishop of Boston on September 25, 1944, following the death of Cardinal O'Connell and honoring his earlier request that Cushing succeed him. During Cushing's tenure, Boston would see the excommunication of Fr. Leonard Feeney for repeated refusals to be summoned to Rome. Feeney refused to back down from his position, although it has been reported that he was ultimately reconciled with the Church before his death.

After the death of Pius XII, Cushing published a moving tribute to him. In 1959, Cushing published a biography of the late Pope Pius XII (1939–1958), depicting the late pope as "Pope of Peace". His work contributed to making the Roman Catholic Church acceptable to the general  population at the time of then-Senator John F. Kennedy's run for the White House. Part of this work included reaching out to the non-Catholics of Boston after "the muscular style of involved Catholicism that Cardinal O'Connell brought to bear on issues of his day - religious, social, and political - in Boston and Massachusetts". Cushing was honored by B’nai B’rith as "Man of the Year" in 1956 for "a lifetime of distinguished service to the cause of human brotherhood under God and in further recognition of great leadership in the fields of education and community relations." He was a close correspondent with Robert E. Segal, longtime executive director of the Jewish Community Relations Council of Metropolitan Boston, who played a key role in Jewish-Catholic relations in Boston. As well as this, Cushing maintained close contacts with Abram L. Sachar of Brandeis University. From the very start of Cushing's tenure as Archbishop of Boston, there was a major change in the relationship between official Bostonian Catholicism and Judaism, where there had previously been much mutual suspicion, Cushing sought closer relations. The author James Carroll has attributed Cushing's outlook to the (non-Catholic) marriage between his sister Dolly Cushing and a local Jewish haberdasherer, Dick Pearlstein. At the time this was very uncommon.Cushing was created Cardinal-Priest of Santa Susanna by the decision of Pope John XXIII in the consistory of December 15, 1958. He was one of the cardinal electors in the 1963 papal conclave, which elected Pope Paul VI. A close friend of the Kennedy family, he officiated at the marriage of John F. Kennedy and Jacqueline Lee Bouvier in 1953, at which he also read a special prayer from Pope Pius XII, and baptized many of the Kennedy children. Cushing gave the prayer invocation at Kennedy's inauguration in 1961. The Cardinal also celebrated President Kennedy's funeral Mass in 1963 at St. Matthew's Cathedral, Washington, D.C., following Kennedy's assassination in Dallas, Texas. The day before the funeral, he gave a televised eulogy for the President. Cushing later defended Jacqueline Kennedy after her marriage to Aristotle Onassis in 1968. He received a large amount of hate mail and was contradicted by the Vatican.

The Boston Globe reported on June 5, 2002 that Church documents released the prior day show the Boston Archdiocese had knowledge of sexual misconduct by several priests who were allowed to remain in active ministry despite complaints. The documents show Cardinal Richard Cushing, who led the Boston archdiocese for 25 years until 1971, approved the moving of at least two priests into new parishes during the 1960s despite allegations of sexual misconduct.

Biography of Pope Pius XII
In 1959, Cushing published his only book, a biography of the late Pope Pius XII (1939–58). It is an almost hagiographic biography, written shortly after the death of the Pontiff. Cushing depicted him as the "Pope of Peace" who, armed only with the spiritual weapons of his office, triumphed over insidious attacks that seemed about to destroy the center of Christendom.

Second Vatican Council
At the Second Vatican Council (1962–65), Cushing played a vital role in drafting Nostra aetate, the document that officially absolved the Jews of deicide charge. His emotional comments during debates over the drafts were echoed in the final version:

He was deeply committed to implementing the Council's reforms and promoting renewal in the Church. In an unprecedented gesture of ecumenism, he encouraged Catholics to attend Billy Graham's crusades. Cushing strongly condemned Communism, particularly the regime of Josip Broz Tito in Yugoslavia.

Due to advanced illnesses Cushing's resignation as Boston's archbishop was accepted on September 8, 1970. Upon his resignation, Senator Ted Kennedy stated: "For three-quarters of a century [Cushing's] life has been a light in a world that cries out for illumination. He will never have to account for his stewardship, for if his goodness is not known to God, no one's ever will be."

Death
Less than two months after his resignation, on November 2, 1970 (the feast of All Souls Day), Cushing died peacefully in his sleep of cancer at the Cardinal's Residence in Brighton, Massachusetts, aged 75. He was surrounded by his brother and sisters and his successor, Archbishop Humberto Medeiros. Cushing was buried in Hanover, Massachusetts at the Portiuncula Chapel on the grounds of the Cardinal Cushing Centers.

Miscellaneous

 Cushing was a member of the NAACP.
 Cushing founded the Missionary Society of St. James the Apostle in 1958 to "serve the needs of the poorest of the poor in South America".
 Cushing wrote the foreword for the Revised Standard Version Catholic Edition of the Bible, and gave his imprimatur to the Oxford Annotated Bible.

Legacy
In 1947, founded St. Coletta by the Sea (now the Cardinal Cushing Centers in his honor) with sponsorship from the Sisters of St. Francis of Assisi. The organization, now Cardinal Cushing Centers continues to support developmentally disabled individuals ages 6 through the life continuum with campuses in Hanover, Massachusetts and Braintree, Massachusetts and community homes throughout the South Shore of Massachusetts.
The now-closed Cardinal Cushing College, a women's college in Brookline, Massachusetts, was named after him.
In 1950, Richard Cardinal Cushing founded the Bon Secours Hospital, now Holy Family Hospital and Medical Center, in Methuen, Massachusetts. Through his guidance and leadership, the hospital has become one of the top Catholic hospitals in the state of Massachusetts
Emmanuel College's Cardinal Cushing Library Building is named in his honor. The building houses the campus' library, a lecture hall, and various classrooms.
Boston College has two buildings named in his honor:  Cushing Hall, a freshman dormitory on the Newton Campus as well as another Cushing Hall, the home of the Connell School of Nursing.
St. John's Seminary (Massachusetts) has their third theology classroom named after the Cardinal: The Richard Cardinal Cushing Classroom.
The main student center of Saint Anselm College in Goffstown, New Hampshire is named the Cardinal. The Cushing houses, among many other significant groups and offices, the Meelia Center for Community Service, a service outreach organization in the greater Manchester area.
In 1961 in Santa Cruz (Bolivia) he left funds for the construction of two schools: The Marista and another that at the beginning was the Cardinal Cushing Institute and then in 1969 the Colegio Cardinal Cushing administered by the religious of Jesus Mary. He was part of the US campaign in the region Santa Cruz, which included propaganda, repression and the use of the Christian faith against the indio peasants. Cushing held a Eucharistic congress on August 9, 1961, and inaugurated the Christ the Redeemer statue.

Works
This is an incomplete list of the various writings of Richard Cardinal Cushing:
 Answering the Call, 1942
 Soldiers of the Cross, 1942
 Native Clergy are the Pillars of the Church, 1943
 The Missions in War and Peace, 1944
 Grey Nuns: An Appeal for Vocations, 1944
 The Battle Against Self, 1945
 The Guide-Posts of the Almighty to Permanent Industrial Peace and Prosperity, 1946
 Restoring all Things in Christ: The Spirit and the Teaching of Pope Pius X, 1946
 Where is Father Hennessey?: Now We Know the Answer, 1946
 The Spiritual Approach to the Atomic Age, 1946
 Notes for the confessors of religious : a collection of excerpts from articles and books on the spiritual direction of sisters prepared for the guidance of ordinary and extraordinary confessors in the Archdiocese of Boston (ad usum privatum), 1946
 The Confraternity of Christian Doctrine, 1947?
 A Novena of Talks on the Our Father, 1947?
 The Third Choice, Americanism : from an address against universal military training, 1948
 The Diamond Jubilee of the Poor Clares in the United States, 1950?
 The Return of the "Other Sheep" to the One Fold of St. Peter, 1957
 A Call to the Laity: Addresses on the Lay Apostolate, 1957
  Meditations for Religious, 1959
  Pope Pius XII, 1959
 Rendezvous with Revolution 196-
 Questions and Answers on Communism, 1960
 A Seminary for Advanced Vocations, 1960?
 The Purpose of Living, 1960
 The Ecumenical Council and its Hopes, 1960
 The Age of Lay Sanctity, 1960?
 Assorted Prayers 196?
 Spiritual Guideposts, 1960
 Americans Unite!, 1960
 I'm Proud of My Dirty Hands, 1960?
 Moral Values and the American Society: Pastoral Letter, The Holy Season of Lent, 1961 1961
 The Sacraments: Seven Channels of Grace for every State in Life, 1962
 The Mission of the Teacher, 1962
 The Call of the Council: Pastoral Letter, 1962
 St. Martin de Porres, 1962
 A Bridge Between East and West, 1963
 Call Me John; A Life of Pope John XXIII, 1963
 Saint Patrick and the Irish, 1963
 Liturgy and Life : First Sunday of Advent, November 1964: Pastoral Letter, 1964
 A Summons to Racial Justice, 1964
 Richard Cardinal Cushing in Prose and Photos, 1965
 Along with Christ, 1965
 "A Quiet Burial" for a Biography, 1965
 The Servant Church, 1966

Articles

  The Church and Philosophy, Proceedings of the American Catholic Philosophical Association, v23 (1949); 9-15
 God's People, Review of Social Economy, v10 n1: 87-89
 The Need for the Study of American Church History, The Catholic Historical Review, v36 n1: 43-46
  Religion in Liberal Arts Education, Christian Education, v30 n1: 13-24

Works on Richard Cardinal Cushing

 The World's Cardinal By M.C. Devine, 1964
 Salt of the Earth: An Informal Profile of Richard Cushing by John H Fenton, 1965
 Cushing of Boston: A Candid Portrait by Joseph Dever, 1965
 Cardinal Cushing of Boston by John Henry Cutler, 1970

References

Further reading
 Cutler, John Henry.  Cardinal Cushing of Boston (1970), the major biography.
 Rabbi James Rudin. Cushing, Spellman, O'Connor: The Surprising Story of How Three American Cardinals Transformed Catholic-Jewish Relations'' (2011) excerpt and text search

External links

FBI file on Richard Cushing at the Internet Archive

Episcopal succession

1895 births
1970 deaths
American Roman Catholic clergy of Irish descent
Boston College High School alumni
Boston College alumni
Saint John's Seminary (Massachusetts) alumni
Roman Catholic archbishops of Boston
20th-century American cardinals
Cardinals created by Pope John XXIII
Participants in the Second Vatican Council
People associated with the assassination of John F. Kennedy
Grand Crosses with Star and Sash of the Order of Merit of the Federal Republic of Germany
Deaths from cancer in Massachusetts
Burials in Massachusetts
People from South End, Boston
Military personnel from Massachusetts
Writers from Boston
Trustees of the Boston Public Library
American Roman Catholic religious writers